Anastrabe is a genus of flowering plants in the family Stilbaceae described as a genus in 1836.

There is only one known species, Anastrabe integerrima, native to Kwazulu-Natal Province in South Africa.

References

Monotypic Lamiales genera
Stilbaceae
Endemic flora of South Africa